National Heritage Act is a stock short title used in Malaysia and the United Kingdom for legislation relating to national heritage.

List

Malaysia
The National Heritage Act 2005

United Kingdom
The National Heritage Acts comprise four Acts of the Parliament of the United Kingdom that aimed to alter the way in which Britain's national heritage assets are managed and protected.

National Heritage Act 1980

The National Heritage Act 1980 established the National Heritage Memorial Fund, abolished the National Land Fund, made provision for property to be accepted in satisfaction of taxation and provided for indemnities for objects on loan from museums and libraries. One of the primary drivers for the Act was the public controversy relating to the refusal of the Callaghan Government to accept an offer of Mentmore Towers and its contents in lieu of inheritance tax.

National Heritage Act 1983

The 1983 Act established the Victoria and Albert Museum, the Science Museum, the Armouries and the Royal Botanic Gardens, Kew as non-departmental public bodies to be governed by boards of trustees.

Section 30 of the Act made provision for the designation and funding of the Armed Forces Museums.

Prior to 1982, other British ancient or historical monuments and buildings had been protected through the Department of the Environment. This was felt by the ruling Conservative government to be lacking in public respect and to be excessively expensive. The 1983 Act created the Historic Buildings and Monuments Commission (HBMC), another non-departmental public body, to be given the a broad remit of managing the historic built environment of England. After the passing of the act, the HBMC was given the shorter working name of English Heritage, by which it was commonly known until 2015. After 2015, the body was divided into two parts, with the Commission being renamed Historic England. English Heritage remained as a charitable organisation, looking after the national heritage collection - including places like Audley End, Kenwood House, and many others.

National Heritage Act 1997

The 1997 Act amended the 1980 Act by extending the scope of the National Heritage Memorial Fund to include things of any kind which are of scenic, historic, archaeological, aesthetic, architectural, engineering, artistic or scientific interest, including animals and plants which are of zoological or botanical interest.

It also modified the 1983 Act, inserting section 31A to make specific provision for preservation of the Royal Naval College site.

National Heritage Act 2002

The 2002 Act extended the powers of the Historic Buildings and Monuments Commission to encompass underwater archaeology within the territorial waters of the United Kingdom.

See also
 Listed Building
 Scheduled Monument
 National Register of Historic Parks and Gardens
 Protection of Wrecks Act 1973

References

External links
 National Heritage Act 1980
 National Heritage Act 1983
 National Heritage Act 1997
 National Heritage Act 2002

Acts of the Parliament of the United Kingdom
Archaeology of the United Kingdom